Harold Douglas may refer to:

Hal Douglas, American voice actor
Harold Douglas of Proston, Queensland
J. Harold Douglas of Dublin Chamber of Commerce

See also

Harry Douglas (disambiguation)